Team jumping equestrian at the 2014 Asian Games was held in Dream Park Equestrian Venue, Incheon, South Korea on September 28, 2014.

Schedule
All times are Korea Standard Time (UTC+09:00)

Results 
Legend
EL — Eliminated
WD — Withdrawn

References

External links
 

Team jumping